The 1934 Connecticut State Huskies football team represented Connecticut State College, now the University of Connecticut, in the 1934 college football season.  The Huskies were led by first-year head coach J. Orlean Christian and completed the season with a record of 1–6–1.

Schedule

References

Connecticut State
UConn Huskies football seasons
Connecticut State Huskies football